Martha Benjamin (born 1935) from Old Crow, Yukon (Vuntut Gwitch'in First Nation) is a Canadian Indigenous cross country skier. With the guidance of Jean-Marie Mouchet (Oblate Priest), she took up the sport of cross-country skiing. Throughout the late 1950s and early 1960s, Benjamin was a national level skier competing throughout Canada, the United States and Europe.

Personal life 
A lifelong resident of Old Crow, Yukon, Benjamin married before the age of 25 and had five children and thirteen grandchildren.

Major sport achievements and rewards 
 US Nationals in New Hampshire - twenty-sixth place finish in a group of sixty-nine men
 1963 - The 10 km (43.29 minutes) women's Canadian women's Nordic Champion Cross Country Skiing in Midland, Ontario
 Trained with Team Canada, however family obligations, as well as funding and support from the Canadian Olympic Committee stopped her for competing at the 1964 Winter Olympics (Innsbruck, Austria).
 1983 - Inducted into the Yukon Sports Hall of Fame.

References 

1935 births
Living people
20th-century First Nations people
Canadian female cross-country skiers
Vuntut Gwitchin people
First Nations sportspeople
Date of birth missing (living people)
20th-century Canadian women